Ruben Angel Rodriguez (born March 3, 1965) is a former American football punter in the National Football League (NFL). He played for the Seattle Seahawks, Denver Broncos and New York Giants. He played college football for the Arizona Wildcats. He is of Mexican American descent.

References

1965 births
Living people
American sportspeople of Mexican descent
Sportspeople from Visalia, California
Players of American football from California
American football punters
Arizona Wildcats football players
Seattle Seahawks players
Denver Broncos players
New York Giants players